Satini Tulaga Manuella is a Tuvaluan politician.

With a background in finance and education, he is, as of 2014, president of the Tuvalu National Private Sector Organisation.

On 19 September 2014, he stood as a pro-government candidate for Parliament in a by-election in the Nanumea constituency. Campaigning on the theme of developing "a healthy working relationship between the education and private sectors", so that Tuvaluans could be "educated in areas that will help boost Tuvalu’s economy", he was elected with 65.2% of the vote, and sat as a backbencher in Prime Minister Enele Sopoaga's parliamentary majority.

On 10 April 2015 he was appointed the Minister of Health; and served as the minister during the Sopoaga Ministry.

He was not re-elected in the 2019 general election.

References

Living people
Members of the Parliament of Tuvalu
People from Nanumea
1958 births
Government ministers of Tuvalu